The 1964 United States Senate election in Maryland was held on November 3, 1964. 

Incumbent Republican Senator James Glenn Beall ran for re-election to a third term, but was defeated by Democratic former State Representative Joseph D. Tydings in a landslide. 

Tydings was the adopted son of former Senator Millard Tydings.

Republican primary

Candidates
 William A. Albaugh
 James Glenn Beall, incumbent senator
 James P. Gleason, candidate for Senate in 1962 and former assistant to Senators Richard Nixon and William F. Knowland
 Henry J. Lague, Jr., perennial candidate

Results

Democratic primary

Candidates
 Morgan L. Amiamo, perennial candidate
 Louis L. Goldstein, Maryland Comptroller
 John J. Harbaugh
 Joseph D. Tydings, former State Representative and son of former Senator Millard Tydings

Results

General election

Results

Results by county

Counties that flipped from Democrat to Republican
Anne Arundel
Baltimore (County)
Baltimore (City)
Caroline
Cecil
Charles
Frederick
Harford
Howard
Kent
Montgomery
Talbot
Washington
Wicomico

Counties that flipped from Republican to Democrat
Dorchester
Somerset
Worcester

See also
1964 United States Senate elections
1964 United States elections

References

Notes

1964
Maryland
United States Senate